Keep It for Yourself is a 1991 black-and-white short drama film written and directed by Claire Denis.

Plot
Sophie comes to New York from France with the intention of meeting up with a man she met a few months before. She finds herself alone in the man's apartment, and she discovers that he left town because he was scared stiff at the idea of seeing her.

Cast
 Sophie Simon
 Sarina Chan
 Michael James
 E. J. Rodriguez
 Jim Stark
 James Schamus
 Michael Stun
 Sara Driver
 Vincent Gallo

Notes
 The French director Claire Denis hired Vincent Gallo to act in several films, such as Keep It for Yourself, the made-for-TV U.S. Go Home, and its follow-up feature Nénette et Boni (1996).
 Claire Denis preferred black faces in her movies at first. "Vincent Gallo is an old face for me - the first time I shot him was 10 years ago in a short I made in New York called Keep it for Yourself".

References

External links 
 Keep It for Yourself at IMDb
 Review at Gareth's Movie Diary (2008)
 "Claire Denis, a Stranger Cinema," Harvard Film Archive

1991 films
Films directed by Claire Denis
1990s English-language films